Kumbhare is a surname. Notable people with the surname include:

Sulekha Kumbhare (born 1962), Indian politician
Vikas Kumbhare (born 1962), Indian politician

Surnames of Indian origin